Ernest Dubeau (April 19, 1882 – June 19, 1951) was a professional ice hockey defenceman. He played from 1906 until 1915 for the Montreal Canadiens, Montreal Le National, Montreal Shamrocks, Berlin Dutchmen and Portage la Prairie. Born in Brockville, Ontario.

Playing career
Dubeau first played senior hockey for Brockville in the Federal Amateur Hockey League in 1905–06. He turned professional the following season for Portage la Prairie of the Manitoba Professional Hockey League where he played two seasons. He returned east in 1908 and played for the Berlin Dutchmen of the Ontario Professional Hockey League, and the Montreal Shamrocks of the ECHA. He played four games for Montreal Le National of the Canadian Hockey Association before the league folded. He played for Trenton in 1910–11, before winning a starting job with the Montreal Canadiens

Dubeau signed with the Canadiens on November 27, 1911. He played four seasons before he was traded to Toronto for Skene Ronan on January 17, 1916. Dubeau scored 16 goals in 76 career games with the Canadiens.

References

1882 births
1951 deaths
Franco-Ontarian people
Montreal Canadiens (NHA) players
Sportspeople from Brockville
Canadian ice hockey defencemen